The Lesser Angereb is a river of northern Ethiopia. According to G.W.B. Huntingford, it rises north of Gondar, and flows southeast of that city to join the Magech River, which empties into Lake Tana. The latitude and longitude of its confluence with the Magech is 

The Angereb is known for having two bridges cross it, which were built either by Portuguese artisans or during the reign of Fasilides. One bridge has four arches and the other also has four arches, where it joins with its parent stream.

See also
List of rivers of Ethiopia

References

Tributaries of Lake Tana
Rivers of Ethiopia